The Estonian Women's Cup is the national women's football cup competition in Estonia. It was first held in 2007.

The record for the most wins is held by the current cup holders Flora with eight victories.

Format
Teams from the first two tiers of women's football are able to enter the cup. Teams from the Naiste Meistriliiga enter the cup only in the third round, which equals the round of 16.

Finals

See also
Estonian Women's Supercup
Estonian Cup (men's edition)

References

External links
Official website
Estonian Women's Cup at Soccerway.com

Est
Women
Cup
Recurring sporting events established in 2007
2007 establishments in Estonia